Oberkirch (Low Alemannic: Owerkirch) is a town in Western Baden-Württemberg, Germany about 12 km North-East of Offenburg and belongs to the Ortenaukreis district.

Oberkirch is twinned with Haverfordwest which is a town in Pembrokeshire, in the country of Wales in the United Kingdom, and Oosterzele, a town in Oost-Vlaanderen, in Belgium.

People from Oberkirch 
 Karl Stecher (1831-1923), painter
 Michael Gerber (born 1970), Roman Catholic bishop

References

External links

  Information about and images

Ortenaukreis
Baden